Theodoropoulos (Θεοδωρόπουλος), meaning "son of Theodoros", is a surname. The feminine form is Theodoropoulou (Θεοδωροπούλου). Notable people with the surname include:

Argyris Theodoropoulos (born 1981), Greek water polo player 
Avra Theodoropoulou (1880–1963), Greek musician and women's rights activist
Dimitrios Theodoropoulos (born 1954), Greek swimmer
Ioannis Theodoropoulos, Greek pole vaulter
Kostas Theodoropoulos (born 1990), Greek footballer
Vicky Theodoropoulou (born 1958), Greek writer

References

Greek-language surnames
Surnames
Patronymic surnames